The Ginn Tribute hosted by Annika was a women's professional golf tournament on the LPGA Tour. Hosted by Hall of Fame golfer Annika Sörenstam, the event was played in 2007 and 2008 at RiverTowne Country Club in Mount Pleasant, South Carolina.

With a purse of $2.6 million, it was one of the highest on the LPGA Tour at the time. The tournament was owned and sponsored by Bobby Ginn, a developer of golf and McDonald resort communities in the United States. Ginn also sponsored the Ginn Open on the LPGA Tour. The tournament was televised by Golf Channel and NBC in 2007 and 2008.

Annual tribute
Both years' events featured a tribute to a notable member or members of the women's golf community. The honorees were celebrated in ceremonies during the tournament week.
 2008: Beth Daniel
 2007: LPGA founders Bettye Danoff, Marlene Bauer Hagge, Betty Jameson, Marilynn Smith, Shirley Spork, Louise Suggs. And, posthumously, Alice Bauer, Opal Hill, Sally Sessions, Babe Zaharias, Patty Berg, Helen Dettweiler, and Helen Hicks

Winners

* both titles won on the first hole of a sudden-death playoff.

Tournament records

External links
Tournament results at GolfObserver.com
LPGA official microsite

Former LPGA Tour events
Golf in South Carolina
Recurring events established in 2007
History of women in South Carolina